The Alberto José Armando Stadium is a football stadium located in La Boca, Buenos Aires, Argentina. Widely known as La Bombonera due to its shape, with a "flat" stand on one side of the pitch and three steep stands round the rest of the stadium.

The stadium is owned by Boca Juniors, one of Argentina's top football clubs. The unusual shape of the stadium has led to it having excellent acoustics and the Boca support being nicknamed "La Doce". The pitch at La Bombonera is the minimum size required under FIFA regulations – 105m × 68m.

The stadium is widely regarded as one of the most emblematic stadiums of the world, and has been declared of public interest by the Government of Buenos Aires autonomous city.

The stadium, as well as being the home of Boca Juniors, who have over 16 million fans (the highest in Argentina), is also used as a concert venue. Past performers at La Bombonera have included Lenny Kravitz, Elton John, James Blunt, the Bee Gees, and the Backstreet Boys.

History

Background

In 1921, following several years of financial difficulties and lack of funds, Boca Juniors put out a fundraising drive to raise money for their next stadium. The drive was successful, with Boca raising enough money to initially rent, then buy, a new stadium. The land they chose, which would become La Bombonera, was owned by Ferro Carril del Sud, which was originally used as a shunting yard, giving them a home for the foreseeable future. The land was also close to railway lines which led out of the city.

Previous to La Bombonera, Boca Juniors had used several locations before settling on their current ground on Brandsen. The club's first ground had been located in Dársena Sur of the old Buenos Aires port (currently Puerto Madero) and Isla Demarchi before moving to Brandsen and Del Crucero (currently Del Valle Iberlucea) streets in 1924. The club built a stadium there. This would be used as their home venue until the construction of La Bombonera at the same location.

In 1931, Boca Juniors' steering committee (led by president Ruperto Molfino) acquired the lands from the Municipality of Buenos Aires for A$ 2,200,000. Three years later the club published a call for tenders to built its new stadium. The project was finally granted to the Delpini-Sulcic-Bes architectural office. which would be also design the Abasto Shopping in the 1990s.

The old stadium (still with wooden grandstands) was used for the last time on April 10, 1938, before being demolished to build the new stadium at the same location. While La Bombonera was under construction, Boca Juniors played their home games at Ferro Carril Oeste stadium.

Opening and later refurbishments

The stadium finally opened on May 25, 1940, with a friendly match between Boca and San Lorenzo, which the home side won 2–0 with both goals scored by Ricardo Alarcón. Due to the fact that the stadium did not have a lighting system, the game only lasted 70' (two halves of 35' each).

The first official game at the new stadium was on June 2, 1940, when Boca Juniors beat Newell's Old Boys 2–0. Ricardo Alarcón (who had scored in the opening game v. San Lorenzo) scored the first official goal at the new venue.

After the stadium was inaugurated, the club continued to introduce refurbishments to expand its capacity. As a result, on November 16, 1941, a second tier was opened on the north side of the stadium, near Casa Amarilla train station. The grandstand was named "Natalio Pescia" in honour of one of the key players in Boca Juniors' history. In 1949 the club decided to add a third tier, adding also a lighting system. All of those works were completed in 1953; this third tier gave the stadium its enduring nickname: La Bombonera. Boca Juniors celebrated with a friendly match v. Yugoslav club NK Hajduk Split, which ended 1–1.

The stadium was named on April 20, 1986, by team President Antonio Alegre in honor of Camilo Cichero, a former team president under whose tenure work on La Bombonera began. It was renamed on December 27, 2000, by team President Mauricio Macri in honor of Alberto Armando, team president during its resurgence during the 1960s as well as a former business partner of his father Francisco Macri. The stadium was expanded and modernized during Macri's tenure, notably with the addition in 1996 of a fourth tier; and a wing housing a press area, VIP boxes, a museum, and offices. The stadium's exterior was later decorated with works by painters Rómulo Macció and Pérez Celis.

Since then, La Bombonera was not remodeled until 1996 when the presidency of Mauricio Macri decided to expand its capacity to 57,500 spectators. Works included the demolition of the lateral boxes on Del Valle Iberlucea street, replacing them by a small stand and new and modern boxes (with metallic structure) placed over there. The "new" Bombonera was reinaugurated with a friendly match v. Club Universidad de Chile won by Boca Juniors by 3–1.

An electronic screen was installed in 2008, making Boca Juniors' stadium the third venue in Argentina with this technology, after the stadiums of Vélez Sársfield and River Plate. At the beginning of 2012, more than 500 seats were replaced and other 500 were added, part of the building of four additional boxes.

Character 
The stadium is notable for the artwork and murals both inside and around the stadium. One of the murals inside the stadium honors the different divisions within the club and many of the clubs legendary players and figures, including Diego Maradona. The mural is made of tile painted blue and yellow and metal busts and sculptures. Several murals outside the stadium depict the lives of residents of La Boca, usually dockworkers, and people wearing Boca Juniors jerseys and apparel.

The stadium is noted for its tendency to shake with heavy fan activity during matches. According to writer Christopher Thomas Gaffney, “La Bombonera does not shake, it beats.” The stadium is also renowned for its location within La Boca, with spectators able to see the dockyards on the Atlantic coast from the highest reaches of the stadium. The stadium is one of many in the city proper of Buenos Aires, with soccer stadiums far outnumbering other sporting grounds, such as polo grounds and race tracks.

Origin of the name
The stadium is popularly known as La Bombonera. It is said that the nickname came about while architect Viktor Sulčič was designing the stadium. On occasion of Sulčič's birthday, a friend gave him a box of chocolates as a gift. After that, Sulčič used to take the box to project meetings with engineer Delpine and other persons that he collaborated with the project to show them that the box shape was very like the stadium they were designing. Since then, the stadium would be known as La Bombonera ("box of chocolates" in Spanish) and that name has remained to present days. In fact, the opening day (May 25, 1940) the stadium was named that way even by the club executives.

There are other stories or myths about the origin of the nickname. One of them tells that Delpini projected the stands with a highly vertical grade of inclination to host 100,000 persons (which was the first project). The shape of the stands looked like the carts used to collect horses dung in the streets of Buenos Aires. Other version credits journalist Hugo Marini or broadcaster Joaquín Carballo Serantes (aka) "Fioravanti" for the Bombonera nickname.

Despite its distinguished nickname, the first official denomination came on April 20, 1986, when it was named "Camilo Cichero" in commemoration of the president under whose tenure the stadium was projected and built. That same day Boca Juniors defeated Talleres de Córdoba by 4–2. Nevertheless, president Mauricio Macri decided to change the stadium's name to "Alberto J. Armando", honoring long-time president of the club during two periods (1954–55, 1960–80).

Facilities

La Bombonera currently has a capacity of around 48,000 and the club's popularity make tickets hard to find, especially for the Superclásico derby against River Plate.

Out of its capacity of 49,000, there are 37,538 seats, 2,780 in boxes, and 8,682 standing. Both its interior and exterior are lined with a number of murals painted by the artist Pérez Celis depicting many of the club's legendary players and aspects of the district's culture, such as the life of Italian immigrants.

In 1996 a small stand was built on the 4th side, which had been largely open until then, except for some VIP boxes.

Diego Maradona, who played for and supported Boca Juniors, had his own executive box at the stadium.

There are three parking lots at the stadium for members.

Argentina national team on La Bombonera
The national team has played several games in La Bombonera, including qualifying matches to the FIFA World Cup. The squad played the most games since the 1920s to the mid-1970s. Since the Estadio Monumental of River Plate was completely refurbished for the 1978 WC, the Argentine Football Association fixtured the majority of Argentina's home games at that venue. That decision was based on the Monumental higher capacity and modern facilities in comparison with La Bombonera.

Playing at Boca Juniors stadium, Argentina was only defeated in two games, having played a total of 27 matches, winning 18 and losing 2 with 7 ties. The squad scored 67 goals and only conceded 27. Some of the official and friendly games played by Argentina at the stadium (as of 25 March 2022) are listed below:

Boca Museum

The Passion of Boca Juniors Museum was opened in 2001 during the Mauricio Macri's administration. It is located within the stadium, just below the grandstands. The Museum was built on two floors and chronicles the club's rise from 1905 (the year the club was established) to the present day.

One of the exhibits in the museum is a giant football with 360-degree footage of the club's fans and players at a match. The museum also includes a Hall of fame and a large mural of Diego Maradona. Also included are non-football items such as the specially commissioned blue and gold guitar played by Lenny Kravitz when he performed at La Bombonera in 2005.

A giant statue of Boca Juniors' all-time topscorer, Martín Palermo, was unveiled in 2011. Other former players who have their statues honoring them are Diego Maradona and Román Riquelme A total of seven Boca Juniors idols have been honored by the club with their respective monuments, they are Guillermo Barros Schelotto, Angel Clemente Rojas, Silvio Marzolini and Antonio Rattín, apart from Maradona, Palermo and Riquelme.

Carlos Bianchi was the first Boca Juniors manager to be honored with a statue, when a monument of his figure was unveiled in October 2016. Bianchi won 9 titles during his two tenures on the club (1998–2003), becoming the most winning manager in Boca Juniors' history. Under Bianchi's coaching, the team also set a record of 40 matches unbeaten, the biggest since Argentine football became professional in 1931.

Redevelopment
There are planned improvements for the stadium, including measures to ease crowd congestion, use of new technology in the stadium and improved corporate facilities. These include:

Main gate, museum and megastore: Work is planned to be done on the main access to the stadium at 805 Brandsen which will include the construction of a megastore, and to then connect the main access with the store and the club's museum.
Third tier: Remodelling work to install further seating and improve spectator comfort.
Stadium gates: Building work to improve access and prevent crowd congestion is underway. The first phase focuses on improving access to the executive boxes and premium seats. In addition, new software and hardware will improve access control with regard to safety and quickness to prevent crowd congestion.
Creation of a corporate area: Businesses will have an area in the stadium with VIP service. One section in the second tier, is being re-designed with two executive boxes and more comfortable seating. The service will also provide businesses with season tickets to allow them to invite clients. It also includes transportation, museum visits and catering services.

In film
Some scenes of the 1969 film Invasión were shot in the deserted stadium.
The Danish film SuperClásico, has a part filmed in the stadium.
The Hong Kong film Happy Together, has a part filmed in the stadium.

Further reading
 Gaffney, Christopher Thomas.  Temples of the Earthbound Gods: Stadiums in the Cultural Landscape of Rio de Janeiro and Buenos Aires.  Austin: University of Texas Press, 2008.

See also

 List of association football stadiums by capacity

References

External links

 
 Images of La Bombonera
 Atmosphere at La Bombonera

1940 establishments in Argentina
Boca Juniors
Buildings and structures completed in 1940
Copa América stadiums
Football venues in Buenos Aires
Sports venues completed in 1940
Sports venues in Buenos Aires